Patricia López (born 4 February 1956) is an Argentine former backstroke, freestyle and medley swimmer. She competed in five events at the 1972 Summer Olympics.

References

External links
 

1956 births
Living people
Argentine female backstroke swimmers
Argentine female freestyle swimmers
Argentine female medley swimmers
Olympic swimmers of Argentina
Swimmers at the 1972 Summer Olympics
Place of birth missing (living people)
20th-century Argentine women